Alassane Diallo (born 19 February 1995) is a Malian football player who plays as a midfielder.

Club career 

Diallo signed with Standard Liège in 2014, joining from K.A.S. Eupen. Previously he has been formed with the Aspire Academy in Qatar. Then K.V.C. Westerlo signed Diallo on a one-year loan deal. He made his Belgian Pro League debut with Westerlo at 19 October 2014 against K.R.C. Genk in a 3-1 away defeat. He replaced Christian Dorda after 86 minutes.

Club statistics

Updated to games played as of 19 May 2019.

References

1995 births
Sportspeople from Bamako
21st-century Malian people
Living people
Malian footballers
Association football midfielders
Aspire Academy (Senegal) players
K.A.S. Eupen players
K.V.C. Westerlo players
Újpest FC players
Football Club 93 Bobigny-Bagnolet-Gagny players
Challenger Pro League players
Belgian Pro League players
Nemzeti Bajnokság I players
Championnat National 2 players
Malian expatriate footballers
Expatriate footballers in Belgium
Malian expatriate sportspeople in Belgium
Expatriate footballers in Hungary
Malian expatriate sportspeople in Hungary
Expatriate footballers in France
Malian expatriate sportspeople in France